"Laila" is a song by Blue System. It is the first track on their 1995 eleventh studio album, Forever Blue, and was released as its lead single around a month prior.

The single debuted at number 88 in Germany for the week of September 25, 1995 and re-entered at number 49 two weeks later, eventually, three more weeks later, peaking at number 29.

Composition 
The song is written and produced by Dieter Bohlen.

Charts

References

External links 
 

1995 songs
1995 singles
Blue System songs
Hansa Records singles
Songs written by Dieter Bohlen
Song recordings produced by Dieter Bohlen